Betsy Morrell Bryan (born 1949) is an American Egyptologist who is leading a team that is excavating the Precinct of Mut complex in Karnak, at Luxor in Upper Egypt.

She is Alexander Badawy Professor of Egyptian Art and Archaeology, and Near Eastern Studies Professor at Johns Hopkins University.

Her work has included research and writing about Thutmose IV and Amenhotep III, and on an Egyptian drinking festival.

Books
The quest for immortality: treasures of ancient Egypt / Erik Hornung and Betsy M. Bryan, editors ; contributions by Betsy M. Bryan ... [et al.]. Washington, D.C. : National Gallery of Art ; Copenhagen : United Exhibits Group, c2002. xiv, 239 p. : col. ill., col. map ; 30 cm.  (alk. paper),  (pbk. : alk. paper)
The reign of Thutmose IV / Betsy M. Bryan. Baltimore : Johns Hopkins University Press, c1991. 389 p., 19 p. of plates : ill. ; 26 cm.  (alk. paper)
Egypt’s dazzling sun: Amenhotep III and his world / by Arielle P. Kozloff and Betsy M. Bryan with Lawrence M. Berman ; and an essay by Elisabeth Delange ; [translation of the essay ... by Arielle P. Kozloff]. Cleveland : Cleveland Museum of Art in collaboration with Indiana University Press ; Bloomington, IN : Distributed by Indiana University Press, 1992. xxiv, 476 p. : ill. (some col.) ; 30 cm.  (hbk.),  (pbk.)
You can be a woman Egyptologist / Betsy Morrell Bryan and Judith Love Cohen ; illustrations, David A. Katz. Marina Del Rey, Calif. : Cascade Pass, 1999. 38 p. : col. ill. ; 21 x 22 cm.  (hbk.),  (pbk.)

References

Sources
Hopkins in Egypt Today
Archaeologists Bring Egyptian Excavation to the Web January 5, 2006
The Gazette Online ""Betsy Bryan ... is part of an international team bringing a new exhibit of artifacts to the National Gallery of Art. ... Bryan is the curator of The Quest for Immortality: Treasures of Ancient Egypt"

1949 births
Living people
American Egyptologists
Johns Hopkins University faculty
Place of birth missing (living people)
American expatriates in Egypt